Gheorghe Boghiu (born 26 October 1981) is a retired Moldavian football forward.

Boghiu played for FC Olimpia Bălţi before moving to Russian First Division side FC Avangard Kursk in 2006. He transferred to Romanian side Oțelul Galați in January 2007. and returned to the Russian First Division to play for FC Chita during 2009.

In June 2014 Boghiu signed a one-year contract with Tiraspol.

Club statistics (incomplete)

International goals
Scores and results list Moldova's goal tally first.

Honours

Club
Moldovan Super Cup
Winner: 1 – 2012 with Milsami

References

External links
Profile at Mikma Sport

1981 births
Living people
People from Fălești District
Moldovan footballers
Moldovan expatriate footballers
Expatriate footballers in Romania
Expatriate footballers in Kazakhstan
Expatriate footballers in Russia
Expatriate footballers in Azerbaijan
CSF Bălți players
Moldovan Super Liga players
Liga I players
ASC Oțelul Galați players
FC Kyzylzhar players
FC Milsami Orhei players
Moldovan expatriate sportspeople in Kazakhstan
Moldova international footballers
Association football forwards
FC Avangard Kursk players
FC Salyut Belgorod players
FC Chita players